Gibbosporina nitida is a species of foliose lichen in the family Pannariaceae. It was described as a new species in 2016 by Arve Elvebakk, Soon Gyu Hong, and Per Magnus Jørgensen. The specific epithet nitida, derived from the Latin nitidus ("glossy"), refers to the lustrous upper lobe surfaces. The lichen occurs in northeast Australia, Papua New Guinea, the Philippines, and Fiji.

References

nitida
Lichen species
Lichens of Malesia
Lichens of Australia
Lichens of New Guinea
Lichens of Oceania
Lichens described in 2016
Taxa named by Per Magnus Jørgensen
Taxa named by Arve Elvebakk